Barbadian singer Rihanna has released four video albums and appeared in 62 music videos, 12 films, 13 television programs, and several television commercials. In 2005, Rihanna signed a recording contract with Def Jam Recordings and released her debut single "Pon de Replay", taken from her first studio album Music of the Sun (2005). Like its lyrical theme, the music video for the song was inspired by disco and dance; it was directed by Little X. Three separate videos were released for "SOS", the lead single from her second studio album A Girl like Me (2006), all of which contained various dance sequences. The same year, American director Anthony Mandler directed the accompanying music video for the second single "Unfaithful", which featured Rihanna in a dangerous love triangle with her lover and her husband. "Unfaithful" was Rihanna's first collaboration with Mandler; they later worked together regularly. Also in 2006, Rihanna played herself in the third installment of the Bring It On film series, entitled Bring It On: All or Nothing.

The music video for "Umbrella", the lead single from her third studio album Good Girl Gone Bad (2007), was directed by Chris Applebaum and featured scenes of Rihanna naked and covered in silver paint. It won the Video of the Year accolade at the 2007 MTV Video Music Awards. Seven more singles, accompanied with separate music videos directed by Mandler, were released from the album. Rihanna flew to Europe to shoot the music videos for the 2007 singles "Shut Up and Drive" and "Don't Stop the Music" in Prague. "Russian Roulette", the lead single from Rihanna's fourth studio album Rated R (2009), featured a cameo appearance by American actor and model Jesse Williams. The music video for the second single, "Hard", was directed by Melina Matsoukas, who also directed the videos for Rihanna's 2010 singles, "Rude Boy" and "Rockstar 101". The same year, Rihanna provided vocals for Eminem's "Love the Way You Lie". The song's accompanying music video features actors Dominic Monaghan and Megan Fox in a love-hate relationship while Eminem and Rihanna perform in front of a burning house. In 2010, Rihanna also filmed the scenes for her second film appearance in Battleship, which was released in April 2012.

In 2011, three of Rihanna's videos met with criticism and controversy. The Matsoukas-directed music video for "S&M" (Loud, 2010)  faced a lawsuit from American photographer David LaChapelle and was banned in eleven countries due to its sexual content. The Parents Television Council (PTC) criticized Rihanna for her "cold, calculated execution of murder" in the video for her 2011 single "Man Down". In September 2011, Rihanna released "We Found Love", the lead single from her sixth studio album, Talk That Talk; its music video caused controversy from some activist groups, including The Rape Crisis Centre in the UK. Christian youth pastors and the Ulster Cancer Foundation also criticized the video for Rihanna's portrayal of sexual intercourse while under the influence of illegal drugs, not being a role model to young girls and women and for smoking in the video. Despite the criticism, the video won the awards for Video of the Year at the 2012 MTV Video Music Awards and a Grammy Award for Best Short Form Music Video at the 55th Annual Grammy Awards. Mandler directed the video for "Diamonds", the lead single from Rihanna's seventh studio album Unapologetic. It depicts Rihanna in four environments that represent the elements of earth, air, water and fire.

Music videos

As lead artist

As featured artist

Guest appearances

Video albums

Film

Television

References

External links 

Rihanna's official Vevo channel on YouTube
Rihanna videography at MTV.com

Videography
Videographies
Filmographies